Wassila Ben Ammar Bourguiba (April 22, 1912 – June 22, 1999) was the second wife of the former Tunisian president Habib Bourguiba and the First Lady of Tunisia from 1962 until 1986. She was called Majda (venerable).

Biography

Family, youth and marriage 
Ben Ammar's father, lawyer Mhamed Ben Ammar, belonged to a relatively impoverished Tunisian bourgeois family previously composed of senior officials and large landowners. Her mother, Fatma Dellagi, also came from the Tunisian bourgeoisie.

Wassila met Bourguiba for the first time on 12 April 1943, when she came to congratulate him on his release after five years of detention.  "It was love at first sight", wrote Habib Bourguiba in his autobiography Ma vie, mon œuvre (French: "My Life, My Work"). Wassila at that time already had a daughter by a small landowner.

Through her budding relationship with Bourguiba, she had a considerable influence over the abolition of the monarchy of the Bey of Tunis and promoted the proclamation of a republic on 25 July 1957. After this, she strongly supported Ahmed Ben Salah, who was appointed on 29 July 1957 as Secretary of State for Public Health and Social Affairs, a minister-equivalent role.

Habib Bourguiba married Wassila on 12 April 1962, about a year after his divorce from Moufida Bourguiba on 21 July 1961. The son of Habib Bourguiba and Moufida, Habib Bourguiba Jr., showed a certain animosity toward his stepmother. Since she was from a family of the traditional Tunisian bourgeoisie, which included influential and rich men, some of the ministers from Tunis saw this marriage as a way to detach Bourguiba from the ministers of the Tunisian Sahel from which Ben Salah originated. Indeed, her support for the latter did not last when he started gaining power.

First Lady 

In 1980, at the time of the attack against the city of Gafsa by an Arab nationalist commando, she acted to appoint Driss Guiga as Interior Minister and Mohammed Mzali as Prime Minister, while Mohamed Sayah was rather more in favour. She also named some of her friends in government positions. For the parliamentary elections on 1 November 1981, the first multi-party elections since independence, she supported the falsification of results to undermine the opposition victory, represented particularly by the Movement of Socialist Democrats Ahmed Mestiri. She was also the main architect of the installation of the Palestine Liberation Organization and its leader Yasser Arafat in Tunis headquarters, after their evacuation from Beirut in 1982. Bourguiba, aging and ailing, gave her more and more responsibilities in state affairs.  Wassila was "permanently connected to telephone conversations."

End of life 
Later, Wassila moved to Paris. Following her former husband's dismissal on 7 November 1987, the Tunisian press announced that she had sent the new president Zine El Abidine Ben Ali a message "expressing her confidence in the new political leadership" and "satisfaction with the rendered respects to the former president". After two and a half years of absence, she returned to Tunisia in July 1988. She died on 22 June 1999 and, unlike the president's first wife, she was not buried in the Bourguiba mausoleum in Monastir.[6] 

She is the aunt of Tunisian-French film producer and distributor Tarak Ben Ammar, and the grandmother of Yasmine Tordjman-Besson who became the second wife of the French Minister Eric Besson. Her grandniece (Taraks's daughter) is a model-singer Sonia Ben Ammar, who was born four months prior to her death.

References 

1912 births
1999 deaths
First Ladies of Tunisia
People from Béja
Grand Cross of the Order of Civil Merit
Dames Grand Cross of the Order of Isabella the Catholic